Saint Roch was a Christian saint who lived c.1295–1327.

Roch or St. Roch may also refer to:
St. Roch (ship), Royal Canadian Mounted Police schooner, the first ship to completely circumnavigate North America
St. Roch, New Orleans, neighborhood
River Roch, Greater Manchester, England
Roch, Pembrokeshire, Wales
Roch Castle, near Haverfordwest, Wales
Nolton and Roch, a community in Pembrokeshire, Wales
Roch III coat of arms, in Polish heraldry
St Roch's F.C., a football club in Glasgow, Scotland
Roch, Iran, a village in Kohgiluyeh and Boyer-Ahmad Province, Iran

People with the surname
Gilles Roch (born 1952), Canadian politician
Gustav Roch (1839–1866), German mathematician
Philippe Roch (born 1949), Swiss civil servant 
Walter Roch (1880–1965), Welsh politician

People with the given name
Roch Carrier (born 1937), Canadian author 
Roch Cholette (born 1963), Canadian account and former provincial politician in Quebec, Canada
Roch Marc Christian Kaboré (born 1957), President of the National Assembly of Burkina Faso and the President of the Congress for Democracy and Progress (CDP).
Roch La Salle (1929–2007), Canadian politician in Quebec
Roch Pinard (1910–1974), Canadian politician
Roch Thériault (born 1947), Canadian cult leader and convicted murderer
Roch Voisine (born 1963), Canadian Acadian singer-songwriter, actor, and radio and television host

See also
Roche (disambiguation)
Saint-Roch (disambiguation)
Church of Saint Roch (disambiguation)

Rotch, a surname